A by-election was held for the Australian House of Representatives seat of Eden-Monaro on 6 March 1926. This was triggered by the death of Nationalist MP Sir Austin Chapman. Canberra residents were not permitted to vote although the Australian Capital Territory is geographically inside the Division.

The by-election was won by Nationalist candidate John Perkins.

Results

References

1926 elections in Australia
New South Wales federal by-elections
1920s in New South Wales